An Argentine legislative election took place on Sunday, 14 October 2001 to elect 127 of the 257 seats in the Argentine Chamber of Deputies, and all 72 seats in the Argentine Senate. The elections were held during the second year of the administration of President Fernando de la Rúa. Elections to the Chamber of Deputies are held using staggered elections, with only 127 of the 257 seats in that chamber being up for grabs.

In the event, the opposition Justicialist Party took control of both chambers of the legislature, severely limiting the power of the administration of De la Rúa. His government was supported by the Radical Civic Union, the Broad Front and the Front for a Country in Solidarity, who contested the election jointly under the banner of the Alliance for Work, Justice and Education.

The Argentine Senate faced its first elections since 1995, and in accordance with an agreement crafted following the 1994 reform of the Argentine Constitution, all 72 seats would be renewed, and three classes of senators elected in 2001 would serve for two, four, or six-years in their first term afterwards. Senators, save for the City of Buenos Aires, had previously been elected by their respective provincial legislatures, but would now be popularly elected.

Background
In 1999, Fernando de la Rúa had been elected President of Argentina in that year's elections. De la Rúa had inherited an economy in recession, and in the midst of an economic crisis. In the end, the 2001 legislative elections were seen as a rebuke for De la Rúa and his handling of the crisis, which was at that point in its fourth year. The Justicialist Party, which had suffered a defeat in 1999, staged a comeback in this election, benefiting from its role as the principal opposition party. Elections in Argentina are compulsory, meaning that those who fail to turn out potentially could face a fine or other punishment. Despite this, roughly a quarter (24.4%) of Argentines eligible to vote, chose to stay at home. The blank votes additionally made up a major share of all votes cast.

Results

Chamber of Deputies

Senate

Notes

References

 
 
 
 
 
 
 
 
 
 
 
 
 
 
 
 
 
 
 
 
 
 
 
 
 
 
 </ref>

2001
2001 elections in Argentina
October 2001 events in South America